= Annual Tax on Enveloped Dwellings =

Tax in the United Kingdom

Annual Tax on Enveloped Dwellings (ATED) is a tax in the United Kingdom. It is payable by companies that own a UK residential property valued at more than £500,000.

The tax was introduced on 1 April 2013 by Part 3 of the Finance Act 2013. There are certain reliefs and exemptions available.

Revenue peaked at £178m in 2015-2016, but has since declined. In 2019-2020, about 86% of ATED receipts were from London. The London boroughs of Westminster, followed by Kensington & Chelsea, dominate the receipts by location.
